The Cemetery Station No. 1 was a railway station on the Rookwood Cemetery railway line in Sydney, New South Wales, Australia. The station operated between 1867 and 1948 and served the Rookwood Cemetery. The building was designed by NSW Government Architect James Barnet.

History

The Cemetery No. 1 railway station (also known as No. 1 Mortuary Receiving Railway Station) was on the Rookwood Cemetery railway line. It was decided that funeral processions could be more dignified (and easier) if more official stations were created to replace the ones with original corrugated iron and timber structures. A scheme set up to separate funeral operations from the ordinary railway by the establishment of new platforms began in 1868 with the building of the Cemetery station inside the Necropolis.

The station opened as Haslem's Creek Cemetery Station on 1 April 1867. Some time before 1872, the station name was changed to Necropolis. The station was called Mortuary Terminus before having its name changed to Mortuary General Cemetery on 26 July 1897, when its name was transferred to the new terminus (later Cemetery Station No. 3 railway station). Finally the name was changed to Cemetery Station No. 1 on 15 June 1908, and it closed on 29 December 1948.

The sandstone station building included wide platforms, a ticket office, two vestibules, retiring rooms and a carriage port. This building was elaborately decorated in a similar style to Regent Street railway station in Redfern. The work of sculptors Thomas Ducket and Henry Apperly and carvers Moxon and Apperly SMH (Thursday 9 April 1868 p5), included angels, cherubs, gargoyles and various foliage carvings featuring flowers, pears, sycamores, apples and pomegranates. Black and white floor tiles created by Cumberland pottery were laid in a tessellated pattern on the floors.

The building spanned the terminus of the railway line into the cemetery so it created a tunnel effect. The northern arch was decorated with two angels opposite each other on the inner side of the arches. One angel appeared to be holding a scroll (which may have been the Judgement book) and its eyes were closed. The other angel was set to look down the railway line and held a trumpet in its hands, which probably symbolised the resurrection of the dead. The building had a bell-cote for housing a bell that was used during the funeral services. The bell was tolled to warn passengers of the impending departure time. It is believed (but not verified) that the bell would ring as each train arrived, and between 1910 and 1920 the bell was rung 30 minutes before the train was to depart to warn the passengers. It rang again when there was five minutes left to departure.

The station was an ornate stone building. After closure the station building was dismantled and moved to Canberra in 1958, where it is now All Saints Church. The rebuilt church contains some modifications, the most obvious of which is the change in position of the bell tower to the opposite side.

Restoration 
In the middle of 2000, work began to improve the station site (at Rookwood Cemetery) and to restore the original pathways. The restoration work included exposing the gutters, uncovering the foundations of the platform (located at 33°52'10.86"S 151° 3'4.48"E), indicating the former locations of the structural columns and re-gravelling the pathways. A signpost at the site indicates the name for the station as being No. 1 Mortuary Receiving Station and states that building work commenced on 14 April 1867, and was completed 10 August 1869.

Gallery

See also

 All Saints Church, Canberra
 Architecture of Sydney
 Cemetery Station No. 2 railway station
 Cemetery Station No. 3 railway station
 Cemetery Station No. 4 railway station
 List of closed Sydney railway stations
 Rail transport in New South Wales
 Rookwood railway station, Sydney

References

Neighbouring stations

Disused railway stations in Sydney
Gothic Revival architecture in Sydney
Victorian architecture in Sydney
Railway stations in Australia opened in 1867
Railway stations closed in 1948
Sandstone buildings in Australia